Antonio Sales (born January 26, 1989) is an American sprinter who specialises in the 200 metres.

At the 2008 World Junior Championships in Athletics held in Bydgoszcz, Poland, Sales won a gold medal over 4×100 metres relay.

Personal best

References

External links

South Carolina Gamecocks bio 

1989 births
Living people
People from Chapel Hill, North Carolina
American male sprinters
South Carolina Gamecocks men's track and field athletes